Percy Chivers (15 August 1908 – 11 July 1997) was an Australian cricketer. He played three first-class cricket matches for Victoria between 1929 and 1930.

See also
 List of Victoria first-class cricketers

References

External links
 

1908 births
1997 deaths
Australian cricketers
Victoria cricketers
Cricketers from Melbourne
People from Templestowe, Victoria